Mazingarbe is a commune in the Pas-de-Calais department in the Hauts-de-France region of France.

History
The village was known as Masengarba in 1046, Masengarbe in 1232 and Mazengarbe in 1558. 
Mazingarbe's first inhabitants, as far as can be ascertained, were Neolithic farmers who grew grain and raised sheep, pigs and oxen. Many flint tools have been found dating from this period.
Other archaeological excavations have unearthed pottery, clay tiles, tools, jewelry and bones, evidence of occupation of the site at the beginning of the first millennium of a Gallo-Roman villa at a place called Le Marais Bray.

In 1046 the village was mentioned as the villa Mazengarba confirmed as a possession of the abbey of Marchiennes. The estate and its lands remained the property of the church until the French Revolution. Under the Ancien Régime, the population was predominantly agricultural. Like most towns and villages of the Artois, Mazingarbe had suffered the ravages of invasions, wars and looting, epidemics of plague, fires and harsh winters. In 1790, there were 328 inhabitants. The records of Croÿ, dating from the early 17th century, show Mazingarbe at that time as a modest little village gathered around a church.

Mazingarbe was home to fewer than 800 people before the opening by the Compagnie des mines de Béthune, in 1859, of the first coal mine, No. 2. Pits No. 6 (1876) and No. 7 (1877) followed later. The population grew at the same speed as industry, the city hosting several waves of immigrant workers, first Belgians and Italians and then later mostly Polish. The creation of a treatment plant and coal processing plant in 1896, which later became a large chemical complex, significantly enhanced the town. 
Mazingarbe suffered heavy damage during the First World War. The battlefront was only two kilometres away at Vermelles. The Second World War did not spare the town either. An Allied aerial bombardment of the factories and mines, in September 1943, claimed 27 civilian victims.

Geography
The A26 motorway passes through the commune.

Population

Places of interest
 The church of St.Rictrude, dating from the nineteenth century.
 The nineteenth-century Château Mercier, now the Mairie (Town Hall).
 The war memorial.
 Two chapels.
 The Commonwealth War Graves Commission cemeteries.

See also
Communes of the Pas-de-Calais department

References

External links

 Official website of the commune 
 The CWGC cemetery, extension to the communal cemetery
 The CWGC graves in the communal cemetery
 CWGC Cemetery, Fosse 7

Communes of Pas-de-Calais
Artois